The Alamo Regional Mobility Authority (ARMA) is an independent government agency created in 2003 to improve the transportation system in Bexar County  in the U.S. state Texas.  The Mobility Authority is headquartered in Downtown San Antonio.

External links
Alamo Regional Mobility Authority Web site

Transportation in Bexar County, Texas
Regional mobility authority